Alice Regina Brown (born September 20, 1960) is a retired American sprinter. Competing at the 1984 and 1988 Olympics she won two relay gold medals and an individual silver medal. She attended John Muir High School (Pasadena, California) and California State University, Northridge.

1980 Olympics
Brown qualified for the 1980 U.S. Olympic track and field team but did not compete due to the U.S. Olympic Committee's boycott of the 1980 Summer Olympics in Moscow, USSR. She was one of 461 athletes to receive a Congressional Gold Medal instead.

1984 Olympics
Noted for her fast start, she was the 1st leg runner in two US Olympic 4×100 Relay teams 1984–88, both teams winning the gold. At the 1984 Summer Olympics, in the individual 100 metres, Brown and American teammate Jeanette Bolden charged out to the lead, only to be overtaken by world record holder Evelyn Ashford, with Brown clearly taking the silver medal. Later, the U.S. relay team won the gold medal beating Canada by over a second, the greatest winning margin in the event's history. This was due to a very strong team which included all three U.S sprinters that made the 100 m final and Brown's superb start. The US were clear favourites as the GDR and USSR teams who would have provided stiff competition were absent due to the Eastern Bloc boycott. The team was never seriously challenged, leading from gun to tape and triumphing with a time of 41.65 seconds, one of the fastest times in history. Shortly after the Olympics, she competed in the 100 metres at the Friendship Games in Prague, which were held as an event for sportspeople from Communist countries who were boycotting that year's Olympics: the only US track athlete to enter the competition, she was unable to repeat her Olympic medal success there.

1987 World Championship
In 1987 Alice won 4×100 relay Gold at the World Championships Rome, Italy. A very strong and well-drilled team consisting of Diane Williams (2nd Leg), Florence Griffith-Joyner (3rd Leg) and Pam Marshall (anchor) were favorite. They won their semi-final with a time over a second faster than the usually dominant GDR team. They went on to win the final from the GDR team (Silver), clocking a time of 41.58 CR, which was a U.S record at the time, and still ranks as one of the fastest times in history.

1988 Olympics
In the 1988 Seoul Olympic Games all nations were present for the first time since the Montréal games in 1976. In the final of the Women's 4×100 Relay all the strongest nations were present except for the Jamaicans who were non starters. Alice Brown once again led the United States challenge running the first leg.  In a superb piece of relay running, she left the field trailing in her wake.  By the time she handed over to Sheila Echols (2nd Leg), she had caught and was passing the Bulgarian athlete in the next lane. Florence Griffith-Joyner (3rd Leg) took over and ran solidly, handed over to Evelyn Ashford (anchor), who in very impressive fashion made up three metres on Marlies Göhr and led the US team to victory by a clear metre. The winning time was down (41.98 seconds) on the U.S record due to sloppy baton exchanges. It was superior basic speed and sheer talent that won the U.S their second consecutive gold in this event.

References

Further reading
The International Track Field Annual 1987/88

External links

1960 births
Living people
Sportspeople from Jackson, Mississippi
Track and field athletes from California
American female sprinters
African-American female track and field athletes
Olympic silver medalists for the United States in track and field
Olympic gold medalists for the United States in track and field
Athletes (track and field) at the 1984 Summer Olympics
Athletes (track and field) at the 1988 Summer Olympics
World Athletics Championships athletes for the United States
World Athletics Championships medalists
Medalists at the 1988 Summer Olympics
Medalists at the 1984 Summer Olympics
Congressional Gold Medal recipients
USA Outdoor Track and Field Championships winners
USA Indoor Track and Field Championships winners
World Athletics Championships winners
Olympic female sprinters
21st-century African-American people
21st-century African-American women
20th-century African-American sportspeople
20th-century African-American women
20th-century African-American people